Nelly Akopian-Tamarina (born in Moscow) is a Russian pianist.

Akopian-Tamarina had performed Haydn concertos publicly with orchestras by age 9.  She studied with Anaida Sumbatyan at the Moscow Central Music School. At the Moscow Conservatory she was one of the last students of Alexander Goldenweiser, continuing with Dmitri Bashkirov.  She won the Gold Medal at the 1963 Robert Schumann International Competition for Pianists and Singers in Zwickau. In 1974 she was awarded the Robert Schumann Prize. Akopian-Tamarina made several recordings for Melodiya, including the Chopin Preludes, op. 28, and the Piano Concerto of Robert Schumann, the last with the Moscow Philharmonic Orchestra. Subsequently effaced from public life, blocked in the Soviet Union from giving concerts, she turned to painting, exhibiting her watercolours in Moscow.

Akopian-Tamarina made her London début at the Queen Elizabeth Hall in 1983 playing Schumann and Chopin. Other highlights of the eighties included the Brahms Piano Quintet with the Vienna Musikverein Quartet; and a series of “Romantic Fantasia” recitals in the Amsterdam Concertgebouw. From 1989 to 2006 her commitments included an artistic consultancy at the Prague Conservatory, masterclasses at the Pálfi Palace, and appointments in London at the Royal Academy of Music and Royal College of Music. Dating from this period, her first British recording, of the Schumann Fantasy, was featured in Brilliant Classics’ 2009 collection Legendary Russian Pianists.

In October 2002, following an absence of twenty-five years, she was invited back to Russia, appearing in the Bolshoi Hall of the Moscow Conservatory. Between 2008 and 2010 she gave a trilogy of recitals at the Wigmore Hall, dedicated to Brahms, Schumann, Janáček and Chopin.

In 2017, her all-Brahms recording of the Variations and Fugue on a theme by Handel and Ballades, Op. 10 was released on Pentatone.  These sessions were from 20 years earlier in Snape Maltings, and partly recorded surreptitiously, with Akopian-Tamarina unaware that the recording producer had returned to the studio for part of the sessions.

Select Discography 

 Slavonic Reflections, In recital at Wigmore Hall. PENTATONE PTC 5186756 (2020)
 Brahms - Ballades Op. 10 / Variations & Fugue on a theme by Handel Op. 24. PENTATONE PTC 5186677 (2017)
 Schumann - Fantasy Op. 17 / Arabesque Op. 18. BRILLIANT CLASSICS 9014/21 (2009)

References

External links 
 IMG Artists agency page on Nelly Akopian-Tamarina
 Pentatone artist page on Nelly Akopian-Tamarina
 https://www.chandos.net/chanimages/Booklets/PT6677.pdf Nelly Akopian-Tamarina
 BBC Radio 4, 'Woman's Hour', 29 January 2008 programme on Nelly Akopian-Tamarina
 Church, Michael 'From Russia with love rekindled', Independent 24 January 2008
 Diggines, Geoff Seen and Heard International review of 9 December 2010 Wigmore Hall recital
 Fanning, David 'Slavonic Reflections', Gramophone January 2021
 Kociejowski, Marius God's Zoo. Manchester: Carcanet Press, 2014. 
 Matthew-Walker, Robert Classical Source review of 23 March 2009 Wigmore Hall recital
 Morrison, Bryce Handel Variations Op 24; Ballades Op 10 review of Pentatone CD International Piano January/February 2018
 Morrison, Bryce Slavonic Reflections review of Pentatone 5186756 CD International Piano 2 December 2020
 Nicholas, Jeremy 'Sparkling Intensity', International Piano January/February 2021
 Orga, Ateş 'Nelly Akopian-Tamarina', Musical Opinion April/June 2019

Living people
Russian classical pianists
Russian women pianists
Moscow Conservatory alumni
21st-century classical pianists
1941 births
Women classical pianists
21st-century women pianists